Thomas Frank Haller (June 23, 1937 – November 26, 2004) was an American professional baseball player, coach, and executive. He played as a catcher in Major League Baseball (MLB) from 1961 to 1972, most notably as a member of the San Francisco Giants where he became a three-time All-Star. Haller ended his playing career with the Los Angeles Dodgers and the Detroit Tigers.

Haller was considered one of the top catchers in the National League (NL) during the late 1960s. In 2008, he was part of the inaugural class of inductees into the San Francisco Giants Wall of Fame.

Major League career
Haller was born in Lockport, Illinois and attended the University of Illinois, where he played as a quarterback for the Illinois Fighting Illini football team. During his time at the university, Haller was also a member of Theta Chi fraternity. Haller was signed by the San Francisco Giants, as an amateur free agent, in 1958. After playing in the minor leagues for three seasons, he made his major league debut with the Giants on April 11, 1961, at the age of 24.

Haller hit .261, with 18 home runs, and 55 Run batted in (RBI), for the Giants in 1962, in a platoon system, alongside Ed Bailey, although both catchers were left-handed hitters. Haller and Bailey combined to give the Giants 35 home runs and 100 runs batted in from the catcher's position as they battled the Los Angeles Dodgers in a tight pennant race. The two teams ended the season tied for first place and met in the 1962 National League tie-breaker series. The Giants won the three-game series to clinch the National League championship. The Giants then lost to the New York Yankees in the 1962 World Series in seven games. Haller collected four hits in 14 at-bats, with a home run, and three RBI, during the Series.

Haller continued to platoon with Bailey through the 1963 season, finishing the year second to Johnny Edwards among National League catchers in fielding percentage. In December 1963, the Giants traded Bailey to the Milwaukee Braves for veteran catcher Del Crandall, and Haller became their undisputed starting catcher. He was a solid defensive catcher for the Giants from 1964 to 1967. In his book, The Bill James Historical Baseball Abstract, baseball historian Bill James said the decision to give Joe Torre a  National League Gold Glove Award was absurd, stating that Torre was given the award because of his offensive statistics and that either Haller or John Roseboro was more deserving of the award. Haller also helped offensively in 1965, hitting two home runs and driving in five runs during a game on September 27 to put the Giants in first place with one week left in the season. However, the Giants faltered and ended the season two games behind the Los Angeles Dodgers.

The following season, Haller earned his first All-Star berth when he was named as a reserve player for the National League team in the 1966 All-Star Game. He was the catcher for two twenty-game winners in 1966, as Juan Marichal won 25 games and Gaylord Perry won 21 games. Haller finished the season with career-highs of 27 home runs and 67 runs batted in, as the Giants once again finished second to the Dodgers, by a game and a half. He earned his second consecutive All-Star berth in 1967 when he was named as a reserve for the National League team in the 1967 All-Star Game. Haller ended the 1967 season second to Tim McCarver among NL catchers in assists and in fielding percentage, and guided the Giants' pitching staff to the lowest team earned run average (ERA) in the National League, as Giants pitcher, Mike McCormick, won the National League Cy Young Award, with a 22-10 record. The Giants finished in second place for a third consecutive season, this time to the St. Louis Cardinals.

In February 1968, the Giants were in need of good infielders, and with four young catching prospects, including Dick Dietz and Dave Rader, club president Chub Feeney decided to trade Haller along with a player to be named later, to the Dodgers, for infielders Ron Hunt and Nate Oliver. Haller played well in 1968, posting a .285 batting average, in 144 games, and earned his third consecutive All-Star berth. He also played well defensively with career-highs in assists (83) and in double plays (23). He guided the Dodgers' pitching staff to the second best team earned run average in the league, although the team finished the season in seventh place.

After spending four seasons with the Dodgers, Haller was traded to the Detroit Tigers, in December 1971. He batted .207 with two home runs and 12 runs batted in during the 1972 season as a backup catcher for Bill Freehan, when the Tigers won the American League Eastern Division championship. Haller was the younger brother of American League (AL) umpire Bill Haller and in July 1972, the two men appeared in the same game with Tom catching for the Tigers while Bill stood behind him as the home plate umpire. His playing time was reduced when the Tigers acquired catcher Duke Sims in August. In the 1972 American League Championship Series against the Oakland Athletics, Haller made only one appearance as a pinch hitter in Game 2, as the Tigers lost the series in five games. In October 1972, the Tigers sold Haller to the Philadelphia Phillies along with pitcher Don Leshnock. Haller then made the decision to retire at the age of 35.

Career statistics
In a twelve-year major league career, Haller played in 1,294 games, accumulating 1,011 hits, in 3,935 at bats, for a .257 career batting average, along with 134 home runs, 504 runs batted in, and an on-base percentage of .340. A three-time All-Star, he was a more-than-capable defensive catcher, ending his career with a respectable .992 fielding percentage which, at the time of his retirement, was second only to the .993 career record of Elston Howard. He set the NL single-season record for double plays by a catcher with 23 in 1968. Haller led the NL in sacrifice flies, in 1968, with 9. Haller caught for six pitchers who would eventually be inducted into the Baseball Hall of Fame. He caught 107 shutouts during his career, ranking him 23rd all-time among major league catchers. Baseball historian Bill James ranked Haller 26th all-time among major league catchers.

Coaching and executive career
After his playing career ended, Haller worked for the Giants as a coach (–), and was their vice president of baseball operations (–). He was named to the Giants' 25th anniversary team, in 1982. Early in the  baseball season, Haller served as the manager of the minor league Double-A Birmingham Barons, of the Southern League (an affiliate of the Chicago White Sox). On June 9, 1986, Haller was named as the General Manager of the White Sox, but disagreements with executive Ken Harrelson led to Haller resigning at the end of the season.

After a long illness, Haller died, in Los Angeles, on November 26, 2004, at the age of 67.

References

External links

Tom Haller at SABR (Baseball BioProject)
Tom Haller at Baseballbiography.com
Tom Haller at The Deadball Era

1937 births
2004 deaths
San Francisco Giants players
Los Angeles Dodgers players
Detroit Tigers players
Major League Baseball catchers
National League All-Stars
Major League Baseball general managers
Baseball players from Illinois
Players of American football from Illinois
San Francisco Giants coaches
San Francisco Giants executives
Birmingham Barons managers
Illinois Fighting Illini football players
Illinois Fighting Illini men's basketball players
People from Lockport, Illinois
Phoenix Giants players
Springfield Giants players
Tacoma Giants players
American people of Austrian descent